Anesa Kajtazovic (born August 30, 1986) is a Bosnian-American politician who was a member of the Iowa House of Representatives, representing the 61st District from 2011 to 2015.  Kajtazovic was an unsuccessful candidate for Iowa's 1st congressional district in an open seat primary in June 2014.

First elected at age 23, Kajtazovic is the youngest woman ever elected to the Iowa legislature, and the first Bosnian American elected to any public office in the United States.

Biography
Kajtazovic was born in Bihać to Bosnian parents from Velika Kladuša and relocated to the United States in 1997 as a refugee of the Bosnian War.

Kajtazovic graduated from Waterloo West High School in 2004 and the University of Northern Iowa in 2007 with double major in three years, with Bachelor of Business Administration degree and a Bachelor of Public Administration degree.

In the Iowa House of Representatives, she served on the Commerce, Appropriations, Veteran Affairs, Local Government, State Government, Ways and Means and the Economic Development Appropriations subcommittees.

Electoral history
Kajtazovic announced her candidacy in Iowa House of Representatives District 21 in March 2010 as a primary challenge to Kerry Burt, the Democratic incumbent. Burt withdrew from the race in the face of criminal charges, but remained on the ballot as the official withdrawal deadline had passed. Kajtazovic won the June primary with 91% of the vote.

In the November 2010 general election, Kajtazovic won with 59%, defeating Republican opponent John Rooff, a former Waterloo mayor.

In 2012, Kajtazovic was re-elected to the Iowa House of Representatives District 61 (renumbered in redistricting) defeating Republican Lyn Tackett.

In August 2013, at the age of 26, Kajtazovic announced her candidacy for Iowa's 1st Congressional District. The seat was open as incumbent Democrat Bruce Braley was instead running for an open U.S. Senate seat. Kajtazovic finished fourth of five Democratic candidates in the June 2014 Democratic primary, but carried her home county, Black Hawk.

Because of the congressional campaign, Kajtazovic did not seek re-election to the Iowa House, and was replaced by Democrat Timi Brown-Powers in January 2015.

References

External links
 Kajtazovic on Project Vote Smart
 Kajtazovic's Capitol Web Address
 Kajtazovic's Website for Congressional Exploratory Campaign
 Anesa Kajtazovic on Twitter

1986 births
American people of Bosniak descent
American people of Yugoslav descent
Bosniaks of Bosnia and Herzegovina
Living people
Democratic Party members of the Iowa House of Representatives
People from Bihać
Politicians from Waterloo, Iowa
University of Northern Iowa alumni
Women state legislators in Iowa
Bosnia and Herzegovina emigrants to the United States
21st-century American women